The 2016–17 season is Tractor 9th season in the Persian Gulf Pro League. Tractor is captained by Mehdi Kiani.

Club

Management

First Team Squad

Current squad

Transfers

Summer 

In:

Out:

Winter 

In:

Out:

Competitions

Overall

Competition record

Persian Gulf Pro League

Standings

Results summary

Results by round

Matches

Hazfi Cup

Kit and sponsorship
Tractor is currently sponsored by the Hamrah-e Aval (Mobile Telecommunication Company) and also Javanane Khayer Foundation. They were previously sponsored by the Bank Sepah. In July 2014, the club signed a contract with Kelme, starting from 2014–15 season.

See also
 2016–17 Iran Pro League
 2016–17 Hazfi Cup

References

External links
Iran Premier League Statistics
Persian League

Tractor S.C. seasons
Tractor Sazi